Backlundtoppen  is a mountain in Olav V Land at Spitsbergen, Svalbard. It has a height of 1,068 m.a.s.l. and is located east of Billefjorden and west of Akademikarbreen. The mountain is named after Swedish-Russian astronomer Johan Oskar Backlund. It hosted a trigonometric station during the Swedish-Russian Arc-of-Meridian Expedition.

References

History of Earth science
Mountains of Spitsbergen